The Inca Trail to Machu Picchu (also known as Camino Inca or Camino Inka) is a hiking trail in Peru that terminates at Machu Picchu. It consists of three overlapping trails: Mollepata, Classic, and One Day. Mollepata is the longest of the three routes with the highest mountain pass and intersects with the Classic route before crossing Warmiwañusqa ("dead woman"). Located in the Andes mountain range, the trail passes through several types of Andean environments including cloud forest and alpine tundra. Settlements, tunnels, and many Incan ruins are located along the trail before ending the terminus at the Sun Gate on Machu Picchu mountain.

Concern about overuse leading to erosion has led the Peruvian government to place a limit on the number of people who may hike this trail per season, and to sharply limit the companies that can provide guides. As a result, advance booking is mandatory. A maximum of 500 people are allowed on the trail each day, of which only 200 are trekkers, the rest being guides and porters. As a result, the high season books out very quickly.

The trail is closed every February for cleaning. This was originally done informally by organizations such as South American Explorers, but is now managed officially.

Classic trail 

Trekkers normally take four or five days to complete the "Classic Inca Trail" but a two-day trek from Km 104 is also possible.

 
Both of these trail segments meet above the Inca ruins of Patallaqta (sometimes called Llaqtapata), a site used for religious and ceremonial functions, crop production, and housing for soldiers from the nearby hilltop site of Willkaraqay, an ancient pre-Inca site first inhabited around 500 BC.
The trail undulates, but overall ascends along the Cusichaka River.

Small, permanent settlements are located adjacent to the trail, and Wayllapampa has approximately 400 inhabitants (130 families) spread along this portion of the trail. Pack animals—horses, mules, donkeys, and llamas—are allowed.

At Wayllapampa the trail to Machu Picchu turns west and begins ascending along a tributary of the Cusichaka. Because of previous damage caused by hooves, pack animals are not allowed on the remainder of the trail. For the same reason, metal-tipped trekking poles are not allowed on the trail.

As the trail ascends toward Warmi Wañusqa, or "Dead Woman's Pass", which resembles a supine woman, it passes through differing habitats, one of which is a cloud forest containing Polylepis trees.
			
After crossing the pass the trail drops steeply into the Pakaymayu drainage. At a distance of 2.1 km and 600 m below the pass is the campground Pakaymayu.

After passing Pakaymayu the trail begins steeply ascending the other side of the valley. The site was heavily restored in the late 1990s. 	 	
			
The trail continues to ascend, passing a small lake named Quchapata (Cochapata) in an area that is recognized as deer habitat. This site had been used as a camp site. As with other sites that were being degraded due to overuse, camping is no longer allowed. The trail reaches the pass at an elevation of 3950 m.

The trail continues through high cloud forest, undulating, sometimes steeply while affording increasingly dramatic viewpoints of mountains and dropoffs. Next, the Sayaqmarka ("steep-place town") is reached followed by the tampu Qunchamarka. A long Inca tunnel and a viewpoint overlooking two valleys: the Urubamba and Aobamba (a broken word), are passed.

		

Another high point at elevation of 3650 m is crossed, followed by a campground, and then after a short descent, a site with extensive ruins. The name Phuyupatamarka ("cloud-level town") (phoo-yoo-patta-marka) is applied to both the campground, and the ruins.
		

Hiram Bingham III discovered the site, but left most of it covered with vegetation. The Fejos team named the site, and uncovered the remainder. Design of the site closely follows the natural contours, and includes five fountains and an altar, which was probably used for llama sacrifice.		
	
The trail then descends approximately 1000 metres including an irregular staircase of approximately 1500 steps, some of which were carved into solid granite. Vegetation becomes more dense, lush, and jungle-like with an accompanying increase in butterflies and birds. A second Inca tunnel is along this section of trail.	
			
 		
Even before passing through the tunnel there are views down to the Willkanuta River, the first since leaving the river at Patallaqta. The number of these views increases. After the tunnel the town of Machupicchu (Aguas Calientes) can be seen, and trains running along the river can be heard. As the trail nears Intipata, it affords views of the "Two Day" Inca Trail (aka "Camino Real de los Inkas" or "One Day Inca Trail"). A small spur of the trail leads directly to Wiñay Wayna, while the main route continues to Intipata. 		
			
Intipata (aka Yunkapata) is a recently uncovered extensive set of agricultural terraces which follow the convex shape of the terrain. Potatoes, maize, fruit, and sweet potato were grown here.		
			

The name Wiñay Wayna (forever young) (win-yay-way-na) is used to refer to both a hostel–restaurant–camp site and a set of Inca ruins. Two groups of major architectural structures, a lower and upper, are set among multiple agricultural terraces at this concave mountainside site. A long flight of fountains or ritual baths utilizing as many as 19 springs runs between the two groups of buildings.

From Wiñay Wayna the trail undulates along below the crest of the east slope of the mountain named Machu Picchu. The steep stairs leading to Inti Punku ("sun gate") are reached after approximately 3 km. Reaching the crest of this ridge reveals the grandeur of the ruins of Machu Picchu, which lie below. A short downhill walk is the final section of the trail.

Inca Trail Permits 
Because of its popularity, the Peruvian Government instituted several controls to reduce human impact upon the trail and within the ancient city. The most notable is a quota system, introduced in 2001, whereby only a set number of people (including hikers, porters, and guides) would be allowed to hike along the Inca Trail each day. This system is still in effect; any person wishing to hike the Inca Trail must obtain a permit beforehand. , 500 permits are issued for each day. All of the year's permits are released in October and are sold on a first-come, first-served basis. Permits were previously released in January, however, in 2017 this changed to October. Permits sell out quickly, particularly those for the high season. Most operators advise hikers to purchase permits as soon as possible after they are released. The government also mandated that every trekker on the trail must be accompanied by a guide. Because of this rule, permits can only be obtained through a government registered tour operator. All permits are paired with an individual passport and are not transferable. The government monitors the trail closely; there are several control points along the trail.

Inca Trail Elevation 

The Inca Trail elevation varies significantly and people often struggle with altitude sickness, especially if they have not spent much time in Cusco before trekking the trail.

Cusco stands at 3,200 metres and is already significantly higher than Machu Picchu itself, though many sections of the Inca Trail are much higher.

Starting at 2,600 metres, the trail ascends to 3,300 metres on the first day. The second day ascends over Dead Woman's pass- the highest point on the Inca Trail at 4,200 metres. This is the most dangerous point for altitude sickness, though little time is spent at this elevation and the trail descends again to 3,600 metres.

The trail only descends from this point until arriving at Machu Picchu at 2,430 metres.

See also
Lares trek, one of the alternative routes to Machu Picchu 
Salcantay trek 
Tourism in Peru 
The Chilean Inca Trail
Inca road system
Capaq Ñan trail

References

Sources

Further reading
 Moseley, Michael 1992. The Incas and their Ancestors: The archaeology of Peru. Thames and Hudson, New York.
 Hyslop, John, 1984. Inka Road System. Academic Press, New York.
 Inca: Lords of Gold and Glory. Virginia: Time-Life Books, 1992.
Andean World: Indigenous History: Culture and Consciousness by Kenneth Adrien.
Footprints Cusco and The Inca Trail Handbook by Peter Frost and Ben Box
 Jenkins, David "A Network Analysis of Inka Roads, Administrative Centers and Storage Facilities." Ethnohistory, 48:655–685 (Fall,H 2001).

External links

 Santuario Histórico de Machu Picchu, SERNANP  (in Spanish)

Archaeological sites in Cusco Region
Archaeological sites in Peru
Medieval roads and tracks
Former trade routes
Hiking trails in Peru
History of road transport
Inca
Transport in South America
Tourist attractions in Cusco Region